Heeria may refer to:
 Heeria (plant), a genus of plants in the family Anacardiaceae
 Heeria (bug), an extinct genus of true bugs in the family Coreidae
 Heeria, a genus of plants in the family Melastomataceae, synonym of Heterocentron